Bill Arp is an unincorporated community in Douglas County, Georgia, United States. The nearby communities are Winston and Douglasville.

A post office called Billarp was established in 1885, and remained in operation until 1907. The community has the name of humorist Bill Arp.

References

Unincorporated communities in Douglas County, Georgia
Unincorporated communities in Georgia (U.S. state)